"Kendo Anthem" is a 2014 single by Finnish band Teflon Brothers. Released on 14 April 2014, the song peaked at number three on the Finnish Singles Chart. In Finland, "kendo" is a tongue-in-cheek term for ice hockey.

Chart performance

References

2014 singles
Finnish-language songs
Teflon Brothers songs
2014 songs